Two ships of the United States Navy have borne the name USS Yarnall, in honor of Lieutenant
John Yarnall (1786–1815).

She served as HMS Lincoln until 1942, then as HMCS Lincoln until 1944. She was then transferred to the Soviet Navy to provide parts for other destroyers.
She served as ROCS Kun Yang (DD-8/DDG-919) until 1999.

United States Navy ship names